Charles Percival "Chilla" Christ (10 June 1911 – 22 January 1998) was an Australian cricketer who played first-class cricket for Queensland from 1937 to 1947.

Cricket career
Chilla Christ (his family name rhymes with "mist") was a left-arm spin bowler who also bowled medium-pace later in his career. He was first chosen to play for Queensland against Victoria in 1930-31 when they were short of players, but the match was rained off, and he had to wait another seven years for his debut. His best figures were 5 for 47 and 2 for 56 against New South Wales in 1938-39. 

He was highly successful in the Brisbane competition. In March 1941, he took 8 for 28 and 9 for 33 for Western Suburbs against Valley. In 1942-43, captaining Western Suburbs, he set a Queensland Cricket Association record for the most wickets in a season, 107 at 8.79. In September 1945, he took 6 for 2 against Valley.

He served as one of the state selectors in the 1940s. He retired as a player in November 1949. He was made a life member of the Western Suburbs club in 1950.

Personal life
Christ married Theresa Gough in August 1940. A primary
school teacher, he was promoted from a position at Junction Park State School in Brisbane to be the head teacher at the primary school in the small town of Wyandra in south-western Queensland at the start of 1950.

References

External links
 
 Chilla Christ at CricketArchive

1911 births
1998 deaths
Australian cricketers
Queensland cricketers
Cricketers from Brisbane
Australian schoolteachers